Electronicos Fantasticos! (stylized in all caps; Spanish for ), also known as Nicos (ニコス), is a Japanese project led by Ei Wada and known for their use of recycled electronics, such as electric fans, CRT televisions and barcode readers, as electronic instruments. The project has a collaborative team called the Nicos Orchest-Lab (ニコス・オーケストラボ) that exchanges ideas and techniques for production and performances.

History 

Electronicos Fantasticos! was founded in February 2015 in Sumida, Tokyo by Ei Wada as a resident art project. As a child, he was convinced that there was a music festival under the tower shaped like crab legs that was embedded in a CRT television, but was then told that a music festival like that did not exist, so Wada decided to create something similar to his dream. He began collecting appliances and going under Stay Production. In November 23, he held his first concert called the First Ensemble Encounter. That same year, Nocos Orchest-Lab was founded. In 2016, he participated in the Kenpoku Art Ibaraki Kita Art Festival with a team set up in Hitachi that tuned locally collected CRT TVs and electric fans into musical instruments.

In November 2017, the group held the Electro-Magnetic Bon-Dance under Tokyo Tower, intended to mourn the dead but was also extended as a memorial service of electronics that played a major role in Japan's economic growth. The event was open to the elderly, children, and others interested including engineers from electric appliance companies. In 2018, they were given an honorary mention STARTS Prize by Ars Electronica.

Music style and influences 
The group uses various recycled electronics as instruments, using various electronic components. A circuit board on the neck of the guitar can modulate the frequency of the CRT screen, which then changes the sound that's produced by the scanner as it reacts to the screen and outputs a digital signal. Fan guitars operate similarly with movement modulating the sound. Nicos Orchest-Lab has produced many modified electronics, dubbing them with names such as the CRTelecaster, Telelele, and TV O-daiko.

The group have also experimented with barcodes and similar patters with a barcode scanner. They have also experimented with clothing with a dress with patterns similar to a barcode dubbed the Barcodress.

Their genre has been described as "barcode techno" and as a "multimedia EDM show" as many members and participants of the group come from various places.

Members 
More than 70 members have joined the project from many fields ranging from engineers, designers, musicians, and management. The group is spread out in Tokyo, Kyoto, Hitachi and Nagoya.
Ei Wada (和田永)
Sonosuke Yamamoto (山本颯之助)
Rika Kawashima (川島里香)
Akira Ataka (安宅晃)
Maiko Aoyama (青山真以子)
Rinichi Washimi (鷲見倫一)
Koki Naka (中康輝)

References 

2015 establishments in Japan
Sony Music Entertainment Japan artists
Japanese electronic music groups